"Thureth" (Þūreð) is the editorial name given to an eleven-line Old English poem preserved only on folio 31v of British Library MS Cotton Claudius A. III, at the beginning of the text known as 'Claudius Pontifical I'. The poem speaks with the voice of this pontifical or benedictional, interceding on behalf of Thureth who the poem tells us had the book ornamented. As Ronalds and Clunies Ross comment: As far as we are aware, this is the only specifically identifiable book, aside from the generic book - or possibly Bible - of Riddle 24, that 'speaks' to us from the Anglo-Saxon  period, albeit on another's behalf.

Text 
As edited in the Anglo-Saxon Poetic Records series, the poem reads:

References

External links 
The poem "Thureth" is fully edited and annotated, with digital images of its manuscript pages, in the Old English Poetry in Facsimile Project: https://oepoetryfacsimile.org/

Old English poetry